Lebanon competed at the 1972 Summer Olympics in Munich, West Germany and won one silver medal. 19 competitors, 17 men and 2 women, took part in 23 events in 9 sports.

Medalists

Silver
Mohamed Traboulsi — Weightlifting, middleweight

Athletics

Men's 800 metres
Hamze Kassem
 Heat — 1:52.5 (→ did not advance)
Men's 1500 metres
Kassem Hamze
 Heat — DNS (→ did not advance)

Boxing

Men's Light Middleweight (– 71 kg)
Farouk Kesrouan
 First Round — Bye 
 Second Round — Lost to Christopher Elliott (IRL), 0:5

Cycling

One cyclist represented Lebanon in 1972.

Individual road race
 Tarek Abou Al Dahab — did not finish (→ no ranking)

Individual pursuit
 Tarek Abou Al Dahab

Fencing

Four fencers, all men, represented Lebanon in 1972.

Men's foil
 Yves Daniel Darricau
 Fawzi Merhi
 Ali Sleiman

Men's team foil
 Ali Chekr, Yves Daniel Darricau, Fawzi Merhi, Ali Sleiman

Men's épée
 Ali Chekr
 Ali Sleiman
 Yves Daniel Darricau

Men's team épée
 Ali Chekr, Yves Daniel Darricau, Fawzi Merhi, Ali Sleiman

Men's sabre
 Fawzi Merhi
 Yves Daniel Darricau

Judo

Shooting

Four shooters, all men, represented Lebanon in 1972.

Trap
 Elias Salhab
 Assaad Andraos

Skeet
 Antoine Saade
 Maurice Tabet

Swimming

Men's 100m Freestyle
Bruno Bassoul
 Heat — 1:00.08 (→  did not advance)

Men's 200m Freestyle
Bruno Bassoul
 Heat — DNS (→  did not advance)

Weightlifting

Middleweight
Mohamed Traboulsi — Silver medal

Wrestling

References

External links
Official Olympic Reports
International Olympic Committee results database

Nations at the 1972 Summer Olympics
1972 Summer Olympics
1972 in Lebanese sport